Maurice George (born 16 November 1977), is a former professional footballer who has played in the Scottish Football League First Division for Greenock Morton. He is currently the manager of Yoker Athletic in the Scottish Junior Football Association, West Region.

References

External links

Living people
1977 births
Scottish footballers
Greenock Morton F.C. players
Beith Juniors F.C. players
Irvine Meadow XI F.C. players
Vale of Leven F.C. players
Scottish Football League players
Scottish Junior Football Association players
Scottish football managers
Association football midfielders